George Falconer (23 November 1946 – 3 January 2013) was a Scottish footballer who played as a forward.

Falconer was best known for his time at Raith Rovers making 68 appearances and scoring 22 goals, he also played for Montrose, Dundee and Forfar Athletic in the Scottish Football League and Elgin City in the Highland Football League.

Falconer died after suffering a heart attack

References

1946 births
2013 deaths
Raith Rovers F.C. players
Dundee F.C. players
Montrose F.C. players
Place of birth missing
Scottish Football League players
Association football inside forwards
Elgin City F.C. players
Scottish footballers